Syntaxin 17 is a protein that in humans is encoded by the STX17 gene. In horses a duplication in intron 6 causes progressive graying.

See also
Syntaxin

References

Further reading

External links